Piero Dusio (13 October 1899 – 7 November 1975) was an Italian footballer, businessman and racing driver.

Biography
Dusio was born at Scurzolengo, province of Asti. During his active football career, he played as a midfielder and made three appearances for Juventus in 1921–22. His career ended in a knee injury, after which he started a textile business (oil cloth), which evolved into sporting goods as well as becoming supplier of military uniforms. He led the Juventus Organizzazione Sportiva Anonima (O.S.A.) 1941 to 1943, which became part of the Cisitalia firm in 1944, and even was president of Juventus from 1942 to 1948.

He raced in the Mille Miglia (1929–38), was sixth in 1936 Italian Grand Prix, winning a class victory (50th overall) in Mille Miglia in a Siata 500cc (1937), and formed the Scuderia Torino (1939).
He commissioned Dante Giacosa of Fiat to develop a racing car (1944), and formed the "Consorzio Industriale Sportiva Italia" (1944). The firm became Cisitalia and involved Carlo Abarth, Rudolf Hruska and Ferry Porsche. Three D46's topped the local Coppa Brezzi (held with the 1946 Turin Grand Prix), Dusio taking 1st.

Dusio continued financing racing car projects, but the expenses in engineering the complex 202MM almost ruined Cisitalia (1947), as well as involved the Juventus corporation. Consequently, Dusio moved to Argentina and established Autoar (Automotores Argentinos) S.A.I.C. (22 March 1949), financially supported by Juan Peron. His son, Carlo Dusio continued to run a refinanced Cisitalia company in Turin (1948–1964). Aldo Brovarone expatriated to Argentina to join the company.

Dusio tried but failed to qualify for one Formula One World Championship Grand Prix (Italy 1952) with a Cisitalia D46, but he failed to set a time in practice due to engine problems. He raced in the Buenos Aires Grand Prix in 1954, and also started Cisitalia Argentina Industrial y Comercial SA, planning cars such as the Cisitalia 750 (1960).

He died in Buenos Aires in 1975.

Racing record

Complete European Championship results
(key) (Races in bold indicate pole position) (Races in italics indicate fastest lap)

Complete Formula One World Championship results
(key) (Races in bold indicate pole position, races in italics indicate fastest lap)

References

1899 births
1975 deaths
Sportspeople from the Province of Asti
Italian footballers
Association football midfielders
Juventus F.C. players
Juventus F.C. directors
Juventus F.C. chairmen and investors
20th-century Italian businesspeople
Italian racing drivers
Italian Formula One drivers
Cisitalia people
Cisitalia Formula One drivers
European Championship drivers
Grand Prix drivers
Footballers from Piedmont